is a Japanese football player. He plays for Tochigi Uva FC.

Club statistics

References

External links

1979 births
Living people
Association football people from Tochigi Prefecture
Japanese footballers
J1 League players
J2 League players
Japan Football League players
Tochigi City FC players
Tochigi SC players
Omiya Ardija players
Ehime FC players
Association football forwards